Viveka Kristina Seldahl (15 March 1944 – 3 November 2001) was a Swedish actress. Born in Överammer, Jämtland, she was partner with the Swedish actor Sven Wollter from 1971 to 2001, they have the son Karl Seldahl.

Besides doing television series and films, she worked at Stockholm City Theatre.

At the 25th Guldbagge Awards she won the award for Best Actress for her role in S/Y Joy.

Seldahl died from cervical cancer in Stockholm in 2001.

Filmography

References

Further reading

External links

Viveka Seldahl on Swedish Film Database

1944 births
2001 deaths
Deaths from cancer in Sweden
Deaths from cervical cancer
Best Actress Guldbagge Award winners
People from Jämtland County
Swedish film actresses
Swedish stage actresses
Swedish television actresses